Blanc Burn is the fourth studio album by English synth-pop duo Blancmange, released on 7 March 2011 by Proper Records. It was Blancmange's first album of new material in a quarter of a century, following 1985's Believe You Me.

Track listing

Personnel
Credits adapted from the liner notes of Blanc Burn.

Blancmange
 Neil Arthur
 Stephen Luscombe

Additional musicians
 Pandit Dinesh – featured artist

Technical
 Blancmange – production
 Mauro Caccialanza – engineering 
 Adam Fuest – mixing 
 Tim Young – mastering

Artwork
 Adam Yeldham – sleeve design
 Blancmange – sleeve design
 Joe Arthur – "Ultraviolent" drawing
 Eleanor Arthur – "Don't Let These Days" image
 Helen Kincaid – "WDYF" image ("Hole")
 Neil Arthur – other images

Charts

References

2011 albums
Blancmange (band) albums
Proper Records albums